CKPT-FM (99.7 MHz) is a Canadian radio station in Peterborough, Ontario. It is owned by Bell Media and airs an adult contemporary format. The studios and offices are on George Street North in Peterborough. The transmitter is on Greencrest Drive.

CKPT has local DJs on weekdays in the daytime. Weeknights, the syndicated On Air with Ryan Seacrest is heard. The station also carries Move Radio's Exclusive AT40 with Ryan Seacrest on weekends.

History

1420 AM
CKPT originally began broadcasting at 1420 AM on December 1, 1959. The station was powered at 1,000 watts by day and 500 watts at night. It was owned by the Peterborough Broadcasting Company. By the 1980s, the power increased to 10,000 watts day/5,000 watts night. CKPT aired an Adult Top 40 format in the 80s and 90s.

In May 2001, CKPT changed from its soft oldies format in favour of a national sports radio network The Team. In August 2002, after just over a year on the air, then-owner CHUM Limited reversed the decision on "The Team" format and returned to music, playing adult standards and oldies as 1420 Memories.

Prior to the switch to FM in 2007, the station was known as 1420 CKPT, Peterborough's Soft Favorites.

Switch to 99.3 FM
In March 2007, CKPT was given approval by the CRTC to convert to 99.3 MHz. The frequency was chosen by CHUM, Inc. Another station, CKKK-FM (now CJMB-FM), was willing to move from 99.5 to 90.5 in March 2007, so CKPT could move to 99.3 MHz. CKKK's move was approved on July 9, 2007. The frequency change to 90.5 took place on August 20, 2007.

Later in 2007, CKPT was one of the stations included in the takeover of CHUM Limited by CTVglobemedia (now Bell Media)

On August 21, 2007, CKPT-FM signed on 99.3 with a hot adult contemporary format under the new name Energy 99.3. The change came just one day after CKKK moved from 99.5 to 90.5 FM. The new CKPT signal simulcast on its old frequency until May 5, 2008.

Move to 99.7
On January 14, 2008, CKPT filed an application to relocate to 99.7 MHz, in order to resolve interference issues to CBCP-FM on 98.7 FM; this application was approved on February 27, 2008.

On June 2, 2008, the remaining AM towers in the four tower array on Crowley Line were taken down. A week earlier, two of the towers were actually toppled, because of structural deterioration. The same day the old AM towers came down on June 2, 2008, CKPT moved to 99.7 with the same format and moniker.

On December 27, 2020, as part of a mass format reorganization by Bell Media, CKPT rebranded as Move 99.7. While the station would run jockless for the first week of the format, on-air staff would return on January 4, 2021.

In 2022, CKPT flipped to adult contemporary.

References

External links
 Move 99.7
 
 

KPT
KPT
KPT
Radio stations established in 1959
1959 establishments in Ontario